= Rita Martin Lopidia =

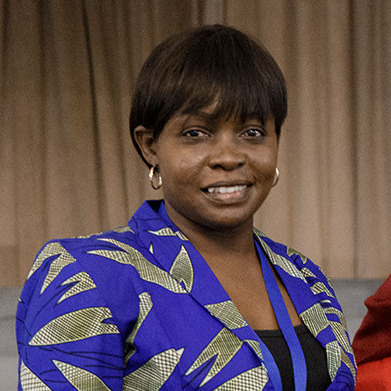
- Citizenship: South Sudan
- Organization(s): Executive Director Eve Organization for Women Development, South Sudan
- Known for: vocal human rights and peace activist

Rita Martin Lopidia is a South Sudanese vocal human rights and peace activist and the co-founder of Eve Organization for Women Development in Juba, South Sudan.

== Biography ==
Lopidia is from Juba, South Sudan. She is a vocal human rights and peace activist, who has organized women activists to demand for women and civil society participation in the IGAD led South Sudan Peace talks in Addis Ababa 2014 -2015 as well as the High-Level Revitalization Process 2017-2018.

Rita was a delegate in both processes and a signatory to the Revitalized Agreement on the Resolution for the conflict in South Sudan – R-ARCSS. Rita has worked with IDPs in Juba, Unity, Upper Nile and Jongolei and is currently engaged with South Sudanese Refugees in Uganda. Rita has addressed the UNSC on several occasions on the situation of Women, Peace and Security in South Sudan. She was nominated for the Post of the Special Rapporteur on the Rights to Freedom of Peaceful Assembly and of Association in 2018. She is a recipient of the CELD Global Women Leadership Award in 2017, the inaugural “Distinguished Partners for Women, Peace and Security Award” for 2019 and the United States Institute of Peace (USIP) inaugural women building peace award.
